Åke Per-Erik Strömmer (10 June 1936 – 22 February 2005) was a Swedish sports journalist, radio presenter and television host.

Åke Strömmer joined the national Swedish Radio-TV company Sveriges Radio and became a popular figure to viewer and listeners as one of the greatest Sports journalist in Sweden. For Swedish radio he hosted the shows På minuten (Swedish counterpart of the UK show Just a Minute) and Minnesmästarna. He also hosted Svensktoppen for the 1978 season. In 1980 he won Stora Journalistpriset. For Swedish television he covered the Olympics on 4 occasions and 2 editions of the Eurovision Song Contest. In 2000 he left SVT and joined rival broadcaster TV4 and returned to sports commentary where he presented the TV4 coverage for the 2000 Summer Olympics as well as football matches.

Åke Strömmer died in February 2005 after suffering from cancer.

References

1936 births
2005 deaths
Swedish radio personalities
Swedish television hosts
Swedish women radio presenters
Swedish women television presenters
Swedish sports broadcasters
Deaths from cancer in Sweden
Svensktoppen
People from Härnösand